Selection Committee may refer to:

 Selection Committee (Hong Kong), an electoral college in Hong Kong
 NCAA Selection Committee, a committee which governs the selection process for the NCAA Division I men's and women's basketball tournaments

See also
 Committee of Selection